Royal Air Force Welford or more simply RAF Welford is an active Royal Air Force station in Berkshire, England.

Opened in 1943, it was used during the Second World War by both the Royal Air Force and United States Army Air Forces.  During the war it was used primarily as a transport airfield.  After the war it was closed in 1946 and placed in reserve status. As a result of the Cold War, the station was reopened in 1955 as a munitions depot by the United States Air Force.

Today it is one of the largest ammunition compounds for the United States Air Force in Western Europe for heavy munitions.

Location
RAF Welford is located in West Berkshire with a dedicated and rarely used access road leading to the station from the eastbound M4 motorway between junctions 13 and 14 to the west of the A34 junction with the M4. The access road from the M4 is signposted "Works Unit Only". The 1 mile marker sign did have the distinctive red border of a defence establishment until changes made in 2015.

History

USAAF use
In October 1943 the airfield was allocated to Ninth Air Force IX Troop Carrier Command (TCC).  While under USAAF control, Welford was known as USAAF Station AAF-474.

315th Troop Carrier Group 
The 315th Troop Carrier Group arrived at Welford on 6 November 1943 from RAF Aldermaston flying C-47s and C-53s. Its squadrons and fuselage codes were:
 34th Troop Carrier Squadron (NM)
 43d Troop Carrier Squadron (UA)
 309th Troop Carrier Squadron (M6)
 310th Troop Carrier Squadron (4A)

The 315th TCG was part of the 52nd Troop Carrier Wing. On 7 February 1944 the group was transferred to RAF Spanhoe.

435th Troop Carrier Group 
As part of the IX Troop Carrier Command's desire to have its C-47 groups commence training with paratroops of the 101st Airborne Division deployed in the Salisbury Plain area, the squadrons of the 435th Troop Carrier Group arrived at Welford on 25 January 1944 from RAF Langar flying C-47s and C-53s. Its squadrons and fuselage codes were:
 75th Troop Carrier Squadron (SH)
 76th Troop Carrier Squadron (CW)
 77th Troop Carrier Squadron (IB)
 78th Troop Carrier Squadron (CM)

The 435th TCG was assigned to the 53d Troop Carrier Wing. In early February 1945 the group was moved to an Advanced Landing Ground at Breigny France (A-48).

USAF ammunition store use

After being placed on a care and maintenance basis after the war, the station re-opened as the home of the 7531st Ammunition Squadron in September 1955. In 2009 USAF staffing at Welford was reduced as part of USAF wide budgetary adjustments. The munitions base's function is described as "at its busiest when the US government deploys bombers to a forward air station at RAF Fairford". The bombers at RAF Fairford can include B-1, B-2 and B-52.

In May 2019, the USAF moved  of explosives to RAF Welford, then the second largest ammunition store in United States Air Forces in Europe – Air Forces Africa (USAFE).

Based units
Welford is now under the command of the 420th Munitions Squadron, and comes under the command of the 501st Combat Support Wing, with headquarters at RAF Alconbury, which provides support to the Geographically Separated Units (GSU)s in the United Kingdom.

See also

List of Royal Air Force stations

References

Citations

Bibliography
Freeman, Roger A. (1994) UK airfields of the Ninth: then and now, London : Battle of Britain Prints International, 
Maurer, Maurer (1983) Air Force combat units of World War II, Washington, D.C. : Office of Air Force History,

External links

420th Munitions Squadron
- History of RAF Welford

Royal Air Force stations in Berkshire
Installations of the United States Air Force in the United Kingdom
Airfields of the IX Troop Carrier Command in the United Kingdom
RAF